Mehdi Jdi (born 13 December 1988) is a Moroccan tennis player.

Jdi has a career high ATP singles ranking of 906 achieved on 16 June 2014. He also has a career high ATP doubles ranking of 1229 achieved on 4 May 2015.

Jdi made his ATP main draw debut at the 2015 Grand Prix Hassan II in the doubles draw partnering Max Mirnyi.

References

External links

1988 births
Living people
Moroccan male tennis players